Catalyst Institute of Management and Advance Global Excellence (CIMAGE) is a college located in Patna, Bihar, India.

CIMAGE Group Of Institutions

The Colleges listed below are the parts of ‘CIMAGE Group of Institutions’ running under ‘Vijayam Educational Trust’ :-

1. CIMAGE Professional College is affiliated to Aryabhatta Knowledge University.

2. ‘Catalyst College’ is affiliated to Patliputra University .

3. ‘Swantrata Senani Shankarlal Agrawal Prabandhan Evam Takniki Mahavidyalay’ is affiliated to Patliputra University .

CIMAGE and IIT Bombay

CIMAGE is the first and only Institution in Bihar to get the status of Super Resource Center from IIT Bombay and it is also the first and only college to start the FOSS CLUB in the state.

Placements

At CIMAGE, we have successfully linked education with the greatest requirement of employability. Today, we also celebrate success in the credit of providing quality education & placement support to more than 3200+ CIMAGE candidates and still counting further. Hundreds of students have been selected in Wipro Technologies, Tata Consultancy Services and ICICl bank since 2012.

Awards and achievements

1. Peacock Feather Award for Excellence in Education as the Best Information & Technology College from Bihar.

2. Best B-School in India (East) Award - National Education Excellence Award ceremony.

3. MCR BLOOMBERG Award

4. National AIMA Award for Best Emerging Management College.

External links

References 

Business schools in Bihar
Universities and colleges in Patna
Colleges affiliated to Magadh University
Colleges affiliated to Aryabhatta Knowledge University
2009 establishments in Bihar
Educational institutions established in 2009